The  is a Japanese international school in Milan, Italy.

The school is within a two-story white building. Francesco Segoni of the publication Magazine of the Università Cattolica del Sacro Cuore argued that the school building looks more like a country house than an educational building.

As of April 2022, the school had 63 students. Almost all of the students have parents working for Japanese multinational companies who had been transferred to Milan. It uses the public educational system of Japan, and is classified as a private school in Italy.

It was founded on 25 February 1976. In 1990 it had 18 teachers, with one being the Italian teacher, and the other 17 being Japanese people. At that time, 140 companies with Milan area offices, all from Japan, helped finance the school.

References

Further reading
 Ōhori, Satoshi (大堀 哲). ミラノ日本人学校 (Mirano Nihonjin Gakkō).  (国土社), 1987.8.  See profile at CiNii. See Amazon profile

External links

 Scuola Giapponese di Milano 
 Scuola Giapponese di Milano (Archive) 
 Scuola Giapponese di Milano (Archive) 

Japanese
Milan
Milan
1976 establishments in Italy
Educational institutions established in 1976